Names of God in Islam ("Allah's Beautiful Names") are names attributed to God in Islam by Muslims. Some names are known from either the Quran or the hadith, while others can be found in both sources.

List

Hadith 
By what they said to Sahih Bukhari Hadith:

There is another Sahih Muslim Hadith:

The Quran refers to God's Most Beautiful Names (al-ʾasmāʾ al-ḥusná) in several Surahs. Gerhard Böwering refers to Surah 17 (17:110) as the locus classicus to which explicit lists of 99 names used to be attached in tafsir. A cluster of more than a dozen Divine epithets which are included in such lists is found in Surah 59. Sunni mystic Ibn Arabi surmised that the 99 names are "outward signs of the universe's inner mysteries".

Islamic mysticism
There is a tradition in Sufism to the effect the 99 names of God point to a mystical "Most Supreme and Superior Name" (ismu l-ʾAʿẓam. This "Greatest Name of God" is said to be "the one which if He is called (prayed to) by it, He will answer."

According to a hadith narrated by Abdullah ibn Masud, some of the names of God have also been hidden from mankind. More than 1000 names of God are listed in the Jawshan Kabir (—literally "the Great Cuirass") invocations.

The influential Sunni mystic Ibn Arabi (26 July 1165 – 16 November 1240) did not interpret the names of God as mere epithets, but as actual attributes paring the universe both in created and possible forms. By these names, the divine traits disclose for humans, whose divine potential is hidden, can learn to become a reflection of such names. However, such reflections are limited; the divine traits do not equal the divine essence of the names. Influenced by the metaphysical teachings of Ibn Arabi, Haydar Amuli assigned angels to the different names of God. Accordingly, the good angels as a whole are a manifestation of God's Names of Beauty. Evil angels (shayatin) on the other hand are a manifestation of God's Names of majesty, such as "The Haughty".

Theophoric given names 

The Arabic names of God are used to form theophoric given names commonly used in Muslim cultures throughout the world, mostly in Arabic speaking societies.

Because the names of God themselves are reserved to God and their use as a person's given name is considered religiously inappropriate, theophoric names are formed by prefixing the term ˁabd (عَبْدُ: "slave/servant of") to the name in the case of male names;

This distinction is established out of respect for the sanctity of Divine names, which denote attributes (of love, kindness, mercy, compassion, justice, power, etc.) that are believed to be possessed in a full and absolute sense only by God, while human beings, being limited creatures, are viewed by Muslims as being endowed with the Divine attributes only in a limited and relative capacity. The prefixing of the definite article would indicate that the bearer possesses the corresponding attribute in an exclusive sense, a trait reserved to God.

Quranic verse 3:26 is cited as evidence against the validity of using Divine names for persons, with the example of Mālik ul-Mulk (مَـٰلِكُ ٱلْمُلْكُ: "Lord of Power" or "Owner of all Sovereignty"):

The two parts of the name starting with ˁabd may be written separately (as in the previous example) or combined as one in the transliterated form; in such a case, the vowel transcribed after ˁabdu is often written as u when the two words are transcribed as one: e.g., Abdur-Rahman, Abdul-Aziz, Abdul-Jabbar, or even Abdullah (عَبْدُ ٱللّٰه: "Servant of God"). (This has to do with Arabic case vowels, the final u vowel showing the normal "quote" nominative case form.)

Examples of Muslim theophoric names include:
 Rahmān, such as Abdul Rahman Al-Sudais (عَبْدُ ٱلْرَّحْمَان ٱلْسُّدَيْس): Imam of the Grand Mosque of Makkah, KSA
 Salām, such as Salam Fayyad (سَلَام فَيَّاض): Palestinian politician
 Jabbār, such as Kareem Abdul-Jabbar (كَرِيم عَبْدُ ٱلْجَبَّار): American basketball player
 Hakīm, such as Sherman "Abdul Hakim" Jackson (عَبْدُ ٱلْحَكِيم—ˁabdu ʼl-Ḥakiym): American Islamic Studies scholar
 Ra'ūf, such as Ra'ouf Mus'ad (رَؤُوف مُسَعد): Egyptian-Sudanese novelist
 Mālik, such as Mālik bin ʼAnas (مَـٰالِك بِن أَنَس): classical Sunni Muslim scholars after whom the Maliki school of fiqh was named 
 Abdul Muqtedar as in Muhammad Abdul Muqtedar Khan (مُحَمَّد عَبْدُ ٱلمُقْتَدِر خَان): Indian-American academic

Use in Baháʼí sources 
Baháʼí sources state that the 100th name was revealed as "Baháʼ" ( "glory, splendor"), which appears in the words Bahá'u'lláh and Baháʼí. They also believe that it is the greatest name of God. The Báb wrote a noted pentagram-shaped tablet with 360 morphological derivation of the word "Baháʼ" used in it.

According to Baháʼí scholar ‘Abdu’l-Hamíd Ishráq-Khávari, Bahāʾ al-dīn al-ʿĀmilī adopted the Persian poetic pen name "Bahāʾ" after being inspired by the words of the fifth Twelver Imam, Muhammad al-Baqir, and the sixth Imam, Ja'far al-Sadiq, who stated that the greatest name of God was included in either the Duʿāʾu l-Bahāʾ, a dawn prayer for Ramadan, or the ʾAʿmal ʿam Dawūd. In the first verse of the duʿāʾu l-Bahāʾ, the name "Bahāʾ" appears four times.

See also 

 The 99, a comic book based on the 99 names of God in Islam
 Basmala
 List of Arabic theophoric names
 Names of God
 Names of God in Judaism
 Sahasranama, the Hindu lists of 1000 names of God
 "The Nine Billion Names of God", a short story by Arthur C. Clarke

References 

 ʾIbrahīm bin ʿAlī al-Kafʿamī (1436–1500 CE), al-Maqām al-asnā fī tafsīr al-asmāʼ al-ḥusnā. Beirut: Dār al-Hādī (1992) (WorldCat listing).

External links 

 Al-Rahman al-Rahim. Problems of Interpretation and Translation

 
Islam-related lists
Language and mysticism